Podchalyk is a rural locality (a settlement) in Dzhanaysky Selsoviet, Krasnoyarsky District, Astrakhan Oblast, Russia. The population was 28 as of 2010. There is 1 street.

Geography 
Podchalyk is located 15 km north of Krasny Yar (the district's administrative centre) by road. Pereprava Korsaka is the nearest rural locality.

References 

Rural localities in Krasnoyarsky District, Astrakhan Oblast